The Syntrophales are an order of Thermodesulfobacteriota.

References

Thermodesulfobacteriota
Bacteria orders